Nikola Rosić (born 5 August 1984) is a Serbian volleyball player, a member of Serbia men's national volleyball team and Romanian club Tomis Constanța, a participant at the Olympic Games London 2012, winner of the European Championship 2011, bronze medalist of the World Championship 2010, and medalist in the World League.

Career

National team
On July 19, 2015 Serbian national team with him in the squad reached the final of the World League, but they lost to France 0–3 and won silver medal.

Sporting achievements

Clubs

National championships
 2009/2010  German Championship, with VfB Friedrichshafen
 2010/2011  German Championship, with VfB Friedrichshafen
 2011/2012  German Cup 2012, with VfB Friedrichshafen
 2011/2012  German Championship, with VfB Friedrichshafen
 2012/2013  German Championship, with VfB Friedrichshafen
 2013/2014  Swiss Championship, with PV Lugano
 2014/2015  Romanian Championship, with Tomis Constanța

National team
 2005  Mediterranean Games
 2008  FIVB World League
 2009  FIVB World League
 2010  FIVB World League
 2010  FIVB World Championship
 2011  CEV European Championship
 2013  CEV European Championship
 2015  FIVB World League
 2016  FIVB World League
 2017  CEV European Championship

References

Living people
1984 births
Sportspeople from Belgrade
Serbian men's volleyball players
Olympic volleyball players of Serbia
Volleyball players at the 2012 Summer Olympics
Serbian expatriate sportspeople in Germany
Expatriate volleyball players in Germany
Serbian expatriate sportspeople in Switzerland
Expatriate volleyball players in Switzerland
Serbian expatriate sportspeople in Romania
Expatriate volleyball players in Romania
European champions for Serbia
Mediterranean Games bronze medalists for Serbia
Competitors at the 2005 Mediterranean Games
Mediterranean Games medalists in volleyball